Patriot Park is a theme park in Kubinka, Russia that is themed around equipment of the Russian military and the Soviet Union's victory in World War II. The park, which officially opened in 2016, is designed around a military theme, and includes interactive exhibits with military equipment (including a mini-Reichstag to storm).

The park incorporates the Aviation Museum of the Kubinka air base and the Kubinka Tank Museum. In 2020, the Main Cathedral of the Russian Armed Forces was completed and plans for an Armed Force Museum are in progress.

The park has hosted International Military-Technical Forum "Army" since 2015.

Specifications 
 Total land area — 5,414 hectares (54.14 km2)
 Military base — 3,530 hectares (35.3 km2)
 Civilian part — 1,884 hectares (18.84 km2)
 Maximum planned attendance is 20,000 visitors

The shooting range inside Patriot Park has an area of over 160 hectares (1.6 km2) and 32 shooting bays:
 One 1400 m long shooting bay
 21 shooting bays of 300 m length
 10 shooting bays of 50 m length

The entire shooting range is more than 2,500 m wide, and each bay has a stand with seats for spectators and participants. There are also firearm storage facilities, changing rooms and a restaurant. The total grandstand capacity is over 2,000 people.

References

External links

 Complete set of photos of Park Patriot collection

Ministry of Defence (Russia)
Amusement parks in Russia
Kubinka